Sundascelia is a genus of moths in the family Geometridae. Species include Sundascelia epelys, which is endemic to Borneo.

References

External links

Geometridae